Bis(chloromethyl) ketone is a chemical substance with formula .  It is a solid, and is used in the making of citric acid. Exposures such as contact or inhalation of bis(chloromethyl) ketone can result in irritation or damage to skin, eyes, throat, lungs, liver and kidneys, as well as headaches and fainting.

Legal aspects 
Bis(chloromethyl) ketone is a substance which is classified as an extremely hazardous substance in the United States as defined in Section 302 of the U.S. Emergency Planning and Community Right-to-Know Act (42 U.S.C. 11002), and is subject to strict reporting requirements by facilities which produce, store, or use it in significant quantities.

See also
 Chloroacetone
 Hexachloroacetone

References

Ketones
Organochlorides